Mihamleh may refer to:
 Mihamleh-ye Olya
 Mihamleh-ye Sofla